is a coastal onsen, or hot spring, located in Nachikatsuura, Wakayama Prefecture, Japan. Originally known as "Katsuura Onsen", the "Nanki-" was added to distinguish it from another onsen in Katsuura, Chiba.

Known as the "Matsushima of Kii", Nanki-Katsuura Onsen is one of the most popular hot springs in Japan due to its location along the coast and springs within caves. The spring is listed as the "Top 100 Onsens" by Kankokeizai News.

Overview 
Nanki-Katsuura Onsen is located within Yoshino-Kumano National Park and Nanki-Kumano Geopark. The area surrounding Nanki-Katsuura Onsen has a very long history, and many of the temples nearby are protected as the Sacred Sites and Pilgrimage Routes in the Kii Mountain Range. The onsen town itself, which dates back to the Edo Period, has more than one hundred springs overlooking the Pacific Ocean. Most ryokans are only accessible by boat from Katsuura Harbor. Aside from its hot springs, Nanki-Katsuura Onsen is also known for tuna.

Nanki-Katsuura Onsen has a character within Onsen Musume named  voiced by Maya Yoshioka.

Transportation 
Nanki-Katsuura Onsen can be reached via Japan National Route 42 by road, or through Kii-Katsuura Station on the Kisei Main Line.

References 

Hot springs of Japan
Nachikatsuura
Tourist attractions in Wakayama Prefecture